Kateryna Oleksandrivna Dolzhykova (born September 25, 1988 in Kyiv)  is a Ukrainian chess player holding the title Woman International Master (WIM).

Chess career
She won the Ukrainian women's championship in 2011. Dolzhykova played on the silver medal–winning Ukrainian team in the women's team event of rapid chess at the 2008 World Mind Sports Games.

On July 24, 2009, she married chess grandmaster Sergey Karjakin. The marriage later broke up. Her sister Olga Dolzhykova is also a chess player, who holds the title of Woman Grandmaster (WGM).

References

External links

Kateryna  Dolzhykova chess games at 365Chess.com

1988 births
Living people
Chess Woman International Masters
Ukrainian female chess players
Sportspeople from Kyiv